Andriy Leonidovych Husin (11 December 1972 – 17 September 2014) was a Ukrainian professional football player and coach. He played in the Ukraine national team, and was one of Ukraine's most capped players. He was a member of their squad at the 2006 World Cup.

After his retirement, he went to become a coach at various clubs, including Dynamo Kyiv. He died in a motorcycle accident at the age of 41.

Club career

Dynamo Kyiv 
Husin was an instrumental part of the Dynamo Kyiv squad which reached the semi final of the UEFA Champions League 1998–99 season. He continued to be a key player in the squad of Dynamo after that, even after head coach's, Valery Lobanovsky's death, and the change of coaches that followed.

Krylia Sovetov Samara
After Ukraine's qualification for the 2006 FIFA World Cup, Husin left Dynamo Kyiv to captain Russian side FC Krylia Sovetov Samara, stating that he wanted to focus on the national team instead of club football and because he had a conflict with coach Yozhef Szabo.

Saturn Ramenskoe 
On 8 June 2007, Husin retired from Krylia Sovetov and joined the FC Saturn Moscow Oblast coaching staff, but in 2008 he decided to play again as well. But with the change of the coaching staff in the middle of the fall, Husin was sent away from the club for supposedly disrupting the club's unity. Husin and others deny this and say that he was sent away because new coach Jürgen Röber wanted to establish his authority at the new club.

He kept up his form with his former team, Dynamo Kyiv, but in its number-two team, Dynamo-2 Kyiv. He demanded compensation from the Saturn, which refused to pay him anything.

FC Khimki 
In the summer of 2009 he signed with the Russian club FC Khimki. He left the club before playing any official games when he received two injuries in a short time and decided he is not ready to play on the Russian Premier League level at the time.

International career 
Following the 2006 FIFA World Cup, Husin announced his retirement from international football, ending a successful 13-year international career with the Ukraine national team. When announcing his international retirement he praised Ukraine's achievement of reaching the quarter-finals in their first appearance in the tournament, in which he played an instrumental role for the Ukrainian team. However, on 15 August 2006, following lengthy conversations with his teammates, Husin announced his decision to remain in the Ukrainian team for the time being.

Personal life and death
Husin died in a motorcycle crash in Kyiv on 17 September 2014. He was survived by his wife and three children.

Career statistics
Scores and results list Ukraine's goal tally first, score column indicates score after each Husin goal.

Honours
Dynamo Kyiv
Ukrainian Premier League: 1996–97, 1997–98, 1998–99, 1999–2000, 2000–01, 2002–03, 2003–04
Ukrainian Cup: 1997–98, 1998–99, 1999–2000, 2002–03

References

External links 
 
 
 
 Profile on Official Saturn Website
 Profile on website Football Ukraine

1972 births
2014 deaths
People from Zolochiv, Lviv Oblast
Sportspeople from Lviv Oblast
Lviv State University of Physical Culture alumni
Soviet footballers
Ukrainian footballers
Association football midfielders
Ukraine international footballers
2006 FIFA World Cup players
FC Avanhard Zhydachiv players
FC Skala Stryi (1911) players
FC Hazovyk Komarno players
FC Karpaty Lviv players
FC Dynamo Kyiv players
FC Dynamo-2 Kyiv players
FC Dynamo-3 Kyiv players
FC CSKA-Borysfen Kyiv players
PFC Krylia Sovetov Samara players
FC Saturn Ramenskoye players
FC Khimki players
Soviet Second League B players
Ukrainian Premier League players
Ukrainian First League players
Ukrainian Second League players
Russian Premier League players
Ukrainian expatriate footballers
Ukrainian expatriate sportspeople in Russia
Expatriate footballers in Russia
Ukrainian football managers
FC Dynamo-2 Kyiv managers
Ukrainian First League managers
Motorcycle road incident deaths
Road incident deaths in Ukraine
Burials at Baikove Cemetery